Akka is a rural locality (a selo) in Khuchninsky Selsoviet, Tabasaransky District, Republic of Dagestan, Russia. The population was 600 as of 2010. There are 2 streets.

Geography 
Akka is located 13 km southwest of Khuchni (the district's administrative centre) by road. Tsurtil is the nearest rural locality.

References 

Rural localities in Tabasaransky District